The temple of Bellona is a temple or sacellum dedicated to the Italic goddess Bellona (possibly here syncretised with Magna Mater) in Ostia Antica.  

It is to be found on the east side of the "Campo di Magna Mater" (Regio IV, Insula THE, n. 4) and is made up of a small building with cella preceded by two columns and three frontal steps.  All, including the columns, is made of brick.  The inside of the cella includes a low podium at the back, frescoed walls, a white mosaic floor and a marble threshold with the holes for the door pivots.

In the temple a relief of two pairs of feet was found, facing in opposite directions - perhaps a votive offering by a soldier who had departed for war and returned safely.

Inscription
Found on the temple steps was the following inscription, naming Aulus Livius Proculus and the duovir Publius Lucilius Gamala Filius as rebuilding it (duoviral involvement proves it was on public land):

{|
|-
| valign = "top" |
|-
|A(ulus) LIVIVS PROCVLVS P(ublius) LVCILIVS
|
|Aulus Livius Proculus [and] Publius Lucilius
|-
|GAMALA F(ilius) IIVIR PRAEF(ectus) CAESAR(is)
|
|Gamala Filius, duovir, prefect of Caesar,
|-
|LOCVM QVOD AEDES BELLONAE FIERET
|
|the place which was a temple of Bellona
|-
|IMPENSA LICTORVM ET SERVORUM PVBLICORVM
|       
|at the expense of the lictors and public slaves
|-
|QVI IN CORPORE SVNT ADSIGNAVERVNT
|
|who are undersigned in the box below
|-
|D(ecreto) D(ecurionum)
|
|by the decree of the decurions
|-
|CVR(averunt)
|
|looked after
|-
|M(arco) NAEVIO FRVCTO ET --- 
|
|By/to Marcus Naevius Fructus and ...
|-
|}
and, on the reverse

{|
|-
| valign = "top" |
|-
|NVMINI BELLONAE SACR(um)
|
|holy to the numens of Bellona
|-
|DEC(reto) DEC(urionum) PVBLICE LOCO ADSIGNAT(o),
|   
|marked as public land by the decree of the public decuriones, 
|-
|LICTORES VIATOR(es) ET HONORE VSI ET
|
|the lictors, viators and in honour of its use  
|-
|LIBERTI COLON(iae) ET SERV(i) PVBLICI CORPOR(ati)
|
|both the freedmen of the colony and the corporation of public slaves
|-
|OPERE AMPLIATO
|
|the whole work
|-
|SVA PECVNIA RESTITVERVNT
|
|restored from their own resources
|}

See also
 List of Ancient Roman temples

External links
Ostia Antica

Bellona (Ostia)
Temples in Italy